Olof Sundby (6 December 1917 – 6 December 1996) was a Swedish bishop within the Church of Sweden. He was the archbishop of Uppsala in the period 1972–1983.

Biography
Carl Olof Werner Sundby was born at Karlskoga in Örebro County, Sweden. Sundby was ordained a priest in the Diocese of Karlstad in 1943. He became a doctor of theology in 1959. He was a parish priest  in the parishes of  St. Peter's Priory, Lund  and Norra Nöbbelöv  in Lund from 1960–1970. He was bishop of the  Diocese of Växjö from  1970–1972 and archbishop of Uppsala  1972–1983. He was  Chairman of the Swedish Ecumenical Committee 1972–1983, chaired the Lutheran World Federation Executive Council 1973-77 and served as President of the World Council of Churches 1975–1983. 

Sundby died during 1996 and was buried at Klosterkyrkogården in Lund.

References

Other sources
Hansson, Klas (2014)  Svenska kyrkans primas: Ärkebiskopsämbetet i förändring 1914–1990 (Uppsala: Acta Universitatis Upsaliensi) 
 

1917 births
1996 deaths
People from Örebro County
Lund University alumni
Lutheran archbishops of Uppsala
Bishops of Växjö
People in Christian ecumenism